Agia Eirini or Agia Irini is a village located on Morphou Bay, approximately 10 km north of Morphou. The village is located within Kyrenia District. It is under the de facto control of Northern Cyprus.

References

Communities in Kyrenia District
Populated places in Girne District